On the Concept of Irony with Continual Reference to Socrates is Søren Kierkegaard's 1841 master's thesis under . This thesis is the culmination of three years of extensive study on Socrates, as seen from the view point of Xenophon, Aristophanes, and Plato.

His thesis dealt with irony, and in particular, Socratic irony. In Part One, Kierkegaard regards Aristophanes' portrayal of Socrates, in Aristophanes' The Clouds to be the most accurate representation of the man.  Whereas Xenophon and Plato portrayed Socrates seriously, Kierkegaard felt that Aristophanes best understood the intricacies of Socratic irony.

In the shorter Part Two of the dissertation, Kierkegaard compares Socratic irony with contemporary interpretations of irony. Here, he offers analysis of major 19th century writers and philosophers including Fichte, Schlegel, and Hegel. One English translation of the book also contains his notes on Schelling's Berlin Lectures of 1841, which Kierkegaard attended shortly after finishing his dissertation.

References

Further reading
For review of Kierkegaard analysis of Socratic irony, see Kieran Egan The educated mind : how cognitive tools shape our understanding. (1997), University of Chicago Press, Chicago , pp. 137–144.
Harold Sarf, Reflections on Kierkegaard's Socrates, in: «Journal of the History of Ideas», volume number 44, issue number 2, April-June 1983, pages 255-276.

External links
 
D. Anthony on The Concept of Irony
Harold P. Sjursen,  Lecture on On The Concept of Irony

1841 non-fiction books
Books about irony
Books by Søren Kierkegaard
Works about Socrates